The Santubong National Park is a national park in Kuching Division, Sarawak, Malaysia, 35 km north of Kuching. It contains the 810m peak of Mount Santubong and surrounding rainforested slopes. There are a number of jungle treks in the park, including to the peak. Wildlife in the park include proboscis monkeys and rhinoceros hornbills.

This is one of the best places in Sarawak where you can observe the rare Irrawaddy dolphin, which chooses rivers, estuaries and shallow coastal areas as its habitat.

See also
 List of national parks of Malaysia

External links
 Santubong National Park - Sarawak Forestry Corporation

References 

National parks of Sarawak
Sunda Shelf mangroves